The Newport Trust Company is a private company whose US address is in New York City. The Trust is controlled by the Newport Group, through a New Hampshire-chartered trust company.

The Trust controls $34 billion in Assets under management on American stock exchanges, including roughly $10 billion in Boeing shares. Its head offices are in Cape Town. In March 2019 it held significant fractions of around four dozen major American firms, with the notable exception of the IT sector. In March 2019, its fund distribution was most heavily weighted towards the industrial sector, followed in a 3:1 ratio with the telecommunications sector.

References

Investment management companies of the United States
Companies based in New York City
Privately held companies of the United States
Mutual funds of the United States